Fútbol Sala Móstoles was a futsal club based in Móstoles, city in the autonomous community of Community of Madrid.

The club was founded in 1989 and her stadium was Pabellón Andrés Torrejón El Soto with capacity of 2,000 seaters.

The club had the sponsorship of Rey Juan Carlos University and Ayuntamiento de Móstoles.

History
FS Móstoles was founded in 1989. playing its first years in local leagues. In 1996, the team makes it debut in División de Plata, after purchase seat of Mejorada FS. In 2009, the club merges with UD Boadilla Las Rozas and Sport Mirasierra to form Boadilla Las Rozas/Móstoles Mirasierra.

Season to season

8 seasons in División de Honor
4 seasons in División de Plata
2 seasons in 1ª Nacional A

Notable players
 Saad Assis
 Borja Blanco
 Paco Sedano

References

External links
Profile at LNFS.es

Futsal clubs in Spain
Sports teams in the Community of Madrid
Sport in Móstoles
Futsal clubs established in 1989
Sports clubs disestablished in 2009
1989 establishments in Spain
2009 disestablishments in Spain